Ringkjøbing Gymnasium is a small gymnasium (secondary school) in the town of Ringkøbing, Denmark.

External links 
 Official website

Gymnasiums in Denmark